Ling Tian Soon, or commonly known as Ah Soon, is a Malaysian politician from MCA. He is the Member of Johor State Legislative Assembly for Yong Peng since 12 March 2022 after winning in the 2022 election in a three-cornered fight. In party organisation, Ah Soon serve as MCA Youth Johor State Chief, MCA Ayer Hitam Division Chief and Organisation Secretary of MCA.

Election results

References 

Living people
Year of birth missing (living people)
21st-century Malaysian politicians
People from Johor
Malaysian Chinese Association politicians
Malaysian people of Chinese descent
Malaysian politicians of Chinese descent
Members of the Johor State Legislative Assembly